Greensboro is a town in and the county seat of Greene County, Georgia, United States. Its population was 3,648 as of the 2020 census. The city is located approximately halfway between Atlanta and Augusta on Interstate 20.

History
Greensboro was founded circa 1780; in 1787, it was designated seat of the newly formed Greene County. It was incorporated as a town in 1803 and as a city in 1855. The city was named for Major General Nathanael Greene, commander of the rebel American forces at the Battle of Guilford Court House on March 15, 1781.

Geography
Greensboro is located at the center of Greene County at  (33.571528, -83.180921). U.S. Route 278 passes through the city center as Broad Street, leading east  to Union Point and west  to Madison. Georgia State Route 44 leads southwest from Greensboro  to Eatonton. State Route 15 leads north  to Athens and southeast  to Sparta. The city limits extend southwest along SR 44 for  so as to include Exit 130 on Interstate 20. I-20 leads east  to Augusta and west  to Atlanta.

Demographics

2020 census

As of the 2020 United States census, there were 3,648 people, 1,288 households, and 808 families residing in the city.

2000 census
As of the census of the year 2000, there were 3,238 people, 1,184 households, and 806 families residing in this town. The racial makeup of this town was 33.45% White, 62.01% African American, 0.40% Native American, 0.31% Asian, 0.28% Pacific Islander, 2.66% from other races, and 0.90% from two or more races. Hispanic or Latino people of any race were 5.34% of the population.

There were 1,184 households, out of which 35.5% had children under the age of 18 living with them, 33.3% were married couples living together, 29.2% had a female householder with no husband present, and 31.9% were non-families. 28.5% of all households were made up of individuals, and 13.5% had someone living alone who was 65 years of age or older.  The average household size was 2.65 and the average family size was 3.22.

In this town the population was distributed with 29.3% under the age of 18, 11.2% from 18 to 24, 26.4% from 25 to 44, 18.7% from 45 to 64, and 14.4% who were 65 years of age or older. The median age of its inhabitants was about 32 years. For every 100 females, there were about 83.9 males. For every 100 females age 18 and over, there were about 78.5 males.

The median income per household in this town was $24,250, and the median income for a family was $27,049. Males had a median income of $22,788 versus $15,720 for females. The per capita income for the town was $14,494.  About 26.4% of the town's families and 31.2% of the population were below the poverty line, including 46.2% of those under age 18 and 23.2% of those age 65 or over.

Education

Greene County School District 
The Greene County School District holds pre-school to grade twelve, and consists of two elementary schools, a middle school, a high school, and a charter school. The district has 158 full-time teachers and over 2,280 students.

Greensboro Elementary
Union Point Elementary
Anita White Carson Middle School
Greene County High School
Lake Oconee Academy

The area also hosts the private school Nathanael Greene Academy.

Notable people
Thomas W. Cobb, former U.S. representative and senator, and judge of the superior court of Georgia; namesake of Cobb County, Georgia
William Crosby Dawson, former congressman and U.S. senator from Georgia; born, died, and buried in Greensboro
Foogiano, rapper signed to 1017 Records, born in Greensboro
Augustus Baldwin Longstreet, lawyer and early American humorist writer, represented Greene County in the state legislature in 1821
Mickey Mantle, center fielder for the New York Yankees, member of the Baseball Hall of Fame, lived in Greensboro during his final years after retiring from the Yankees
Joshua Nesbitt, former starting quarterback for the Georgia Tech football team
Joseph Parker Jr., last surviving U.S. Navy physician who participated in the Allied invasion of Omaha Beach 
John Perkins Ralls, Confederate congressman from Alabama, born in Greensboro
Tim Simpson, professional golfer, lives in Greensboro
Sonny Terry, blues and folk musician known for his energetic harmonica style, born in Greensboro
Elizabeth Wilson, first African American mayor of Decatur, Georgia

References

External links
 City website
 The Burning of Greensborough historical marker
 Historic Springfield Baptist Church historical marker

Towns in Greene County, Georgia
County seats in Georgia (U.S. state)